Carmela Zumbado (born February 27, 1991) is an American actress. Her breakthrough role was as Delilah Alves in the Netflix thriller series You (2019). She subsequently earned praise for playing Ximena Arista in the drama film The Wall of Mexico (2019), and has additionally played Jeny B in the sports film Need for Speed (2014) and Denise Martinez on the musical series Crazy Ex-Girlfriend (2019). She appeared on season nine of Chicago P.D. in a recurring role.

Career 
Zumbado began acting in 2012, making her debut with two appearances on the television crime series America’s Most Wanted, appearing first as Karen Martinez, then as Teresa Martinez. In the same year, she appeared in the television film Freestyle Love Supreme as Rachel, a film which was later adapted onto Broadway. Zumbado continued to make appearances on shows such as Necessary Roughness and Graceland in 2013, and in the same year made a cameo appearance in the film Identity Thief, as a salesperson at a salon.

In 2014, she made her film debut as Jeny B in the action-thriller film Need for Speed. The film was a commercial success and critical failure. She made appearances on various television shows that same year, including a cameo appearance in the Netflix series Bloodline. Zumbado had a recurring role as Windi Stewart in the crime series NCIS: New Orleans and appeared as Susan in the crime series NCIS: Los Angeles. In 2016, she had a guest role as Denise Martinez on the comedic television series Crazy Ex-Girlfriend, which she later reprised in 2019.

In 2019, she starred as Ximena Arista in the drama film The Wall of Mexico, which was favorably received. In the same year, it was announced that she was cast in the role of Delilah Alves in the second season of the Netflix thriller series You. Zumbado had a guest role as Paloma Ball on the final season of the television series The Magicians, and played Gwen, the ex-wife of character Freddie Benson on the sitcom reboot iCarly.

Filmography

Film

Television

References

External links 

 
 Carmela Zumbado on Instagram

Living people
1991 births
21st-century American actresses
Actresses from California
American television actresses
American LGBT rights activists